The ikurrina flag (in Basque) or ikurriña (Spanish spelling of the Basque term) is a Basque symbol and the official flag of the Basque Country Autonomous Community of Spain. This flag consists of a white cross over a green saltire on a red field.

Terminology
The name is a neologism by Luis and Sabino Arana, from  'mark, sign' (itself a neologism extracted from  'to read'), comparable to the Catalan  and Faroese . In Basque, it has the generic meaning of 'flag', but specially the one of the Basque Country, as defined by the Euskaltzaindia (Royal Academy of the Basque Language).

Design

Similar in pattern to the Union Jack, the flag was designed by the founders of the Basque Nationalist Party EAJ-PNV, Luis and Sabino Arana, and is commonly regarded as the national but unofficial symbol of the Basque Country (Euskal Herria). It is widely seen in the French Basque Country and forms part of the unofficial flag of Saint Pierre and Miquelon, the French overseas community in North America that was settled by French Basque and also many Spanish Basque sailors. The Ikurriña is also the flag of the Basque Nationalist Party (EAJ-PNV). A controversy exists because at first it was only the symbol of a section of the party (the section representing the province of Biscay) and many people thought that another flag must represent the entire country.

The red ground symbolizes the Biscayne people, the green saltire might represent the Oak of Guernica, a symbol of the old laws of Biscay, or Fueros; and over them, the white cross, God's symbol of Basque Catholic devotion. Thus, red, white and green have become the national Basque colors.

History
The flag was designed in 1894 to represent the province of Biscay in a set of one flag for each of the seven Basque provinces and one for the whole country; however, since PNV activity was scarce outside of Biscay, only the Biscayne flag was publicly recognized. It was hoisted for the first time in the "Euzkeldun Batzokija", the club that preceded EAJ-PNV. The party adopted it in 1895 and, in 1933, proposed it as the flag of the whole Basque Country.

Since the Basque people had accepted the "ikurriña", at the suggestion of the socialist counselor Aznar, the Basque Government adopted it as the flag of the Basque Autonomous Region in 1936. This flag was used as the Naval jack of the Basque Auxiliary Navy, a section of the Spanish Republican Navy operating in the Bay of Biscay during the Spanish Civil War.

In 1938, after the military defeat of the Basque Government, the regime of General Franco prohibited this flag —although it continued to be used in the Northern Basque Country. In the following decades it became a symbol of defiance – the first actions of the clandestine group ETA involved placing flags in public places.

The Basque flag was legalised again in 1977 during the Spanish transition to democracy. Two years later, the Basque Government adopted it as the flag of the Basque autonomous community. It is also used as an unofficial flag for some sectors of Basque society in other provinces.

Gallery

See also

 The arrano beltza ("black eagle") is another flag often displayed by Basque leftist nationalists besides Ikurriña.
 The flag of Navarre is also used by a sector of nationalism that considers the kingdom of Navarre as a precedent of a future Basque state. The three flags can be found side by side on some events.
 The modern flag of Saint Pierre et Miquelon (French North America) recognizes its Basque heritage by including an ikurriña.
 Religion in national symbols
 Basque people
 Coat of arms of Basque Country (autonomous community)
 Zazpiak Bat
 Politics and sports

References
 Apuntes para la historia del nacionalismo vasco: las banderas de los ex-Estados históricos vascos o regiones autónomas, Luis de Arana Goiri, 1930. Scanned pages of a typewritten manuscript.

External links

 www.ikurrinamunduan.com Photographs in which the Ikurriña appears outside the borders of Euskal Herria.
 The French regiment des Cars used a similar flag in the 18th century.

Basque culture
Flags of Spain
Flags of indigenous peoples
National flags
Flags with crosses